William Charles Cotton (10 April 1894 – 1971) was an English professional footballer who played as an inside forward.

Career statistics
Source:

References

1894 births
1971 deaths
Footballers from Liverpool
English footballers
Association football inside forwards
South Liverpool F.C. (1890s) players
Wrexham A.F.C. players
Kettering Town F.C. players
Port Vale F.C. players
Connah's Quay & Shotton F.C. players
Halifax Town A.F.C. players
Crewe Alexandra F.C. players
Yeovil Town F.C. players
Prescot Cables F.C. players
English Football League players
Southern Football League players